Value measuring methodology (VMM) is a tool that helps financial planners balance both tangible and intangible values when making investment decisions, and monitor benefits.

Formal methods to calculate the Return on investment (ROI) have been widely understood and used for a long time, but there was no easy and widely known way to provide a formal justification for decisions based on intangible values, which can include the reputation of an organization, the wellbeing of staff, or the impact on society or the environment at large.  It was particularly difficult for decision makers to work through the trade-offs between costs and intangible benefits, especially for long-term investments by commercial organizations, and for governments and non-profit organizations who are primarily concerned with intangible values without wasting limited funds.  Even within commercial organizations, units traditionally viewed as "cost centres" found it difficult to get acceptance of proposals for projects that would lead to general and long-term efficiency or capability gains, as the benefits were difficult to assign to "profit centres".

The approach of the VMM is to start by developing a framework of values, including costs, risks, tangible returns and intangible returns, then assign scores to each element in the framework.  Once the relative scores of the different types of values are assigned and agreed, it becomes possible to examine alternatives and give yes/no decisions in a fairly objective and repeatable manner, and review progress using a range of traditional quantitative program management techniques.  As well as allowing comparison of different values within a project, the quantitative approach of the VMM permits review of the total contribution to a particular value across a range of projects.

History and Adoption
VMM was developed by the General Services Administration's (GSA) Office of Government-wide Policy (OGP) in collaboration with Harvard University.  The VMM was first articulated in a report by Booz Allen Hamilton in 2002 for the US Social Security Administration, as part of an electronic services project.

It was popularized by a suite of documents released by the US Federal Chief Information Officers Council in 2003, which give detailed guidance to agencies helping them to seek funding and plan budgets for their proposals, analyze their investments for values across their portfolio of initiatives, and track both tangible and intangible returns over time, with a particular emphasis on information technology investments and the production of OMB-300 exhibits for the US Office of Management and Budget.  The introductory document was given the significant title It's Not Just Return on Investment Anymore.

The suite of documents from the US CIO Council include the following, which are readily adapted for other countries and non-government organizations:
FAQ (Frequently Asked Questions)
Introduction
How-To-Guide
Highlights (key elements from the how-to guide, and probably the best document for initial study)

Outline of the steps in the VMM
Each of the four major steps of the VMM process has tasks and outputs.  The breakdown below, and the description of major value factors, is based primarily on the suite of VMM documents from the US Federal Chief Information Officers Council in 2003.

Develop a decision framework
Tasks
Identify and define value structure
Identify and define risk structure
Identify and define cost structure
Begin documentation
Outputs
Prioritized value factors
Defined and prioritized measures within each value factor
Initial risk factor inventory
Risk tolerance boundary
Tailored cost structure
Initial documentation of basis of estimate of cost, value and risk

Forcing the development of the decision framework, with the assignment of scores to intangibles allowing comparison to other intangibles as well as tangibles, eases the resolution of differences of perspectives between senior managers (e.g. Chief Financial Officer, Risk Manager, and the proposer of the initiative), allows changes to the scores to flow through to the rest of the process (especially the analysis of alternatives), and provides clarity of benefits to a board (before, during, and after the initiative), and clarity of priorities to people looking after more detailed aspects of the initiative.  The same transparency of values apply if the proposal is developed at an enterprise level, or within a lesser organizational unit.

Major value factors (from which the value hierarchy is developed) include the following
direct customer value: benefits to customers/clients, e.g. convenient access, product enhancement
social: benefits to society as a whole, e.g. reducing CO2 emissions
operational: better operations and lowering barriers to future initiatives, e.g. improved infrastructure
strategic: contributions to strategic initiatives and fulfilling the mission of the organization
financial: financial benefits, including increased revenue, decreased costs, and cost avoidance

Analyze alternatives
Tasks
Identify and define alternatives
Estimate value and cost
Conduct risk analysis
Ongoing documentation
Outputs
Viable alternatives for solutions
Cost and value analyses
Risk analyses
Tailored basis of estimate documenting value, cost, and risk, economic factors and assumptions

Pull the information together
Tasks
Aggregate the cost estimate
Calculate the return on investment
Calculate the value score
Calculate the risk score
Compare value, cost, and risk
Outputs
Cost estimate
ROI metrics
Value score
Risk scores (cost and value)
Comparison of cost, value and risk

Communicate and document
Tasks
Communicate value to customers and stakeholders
Prepare budget justification document
Satisfy ad hoc reporting requirement
Use lessons learned to improve processes
Outputs
Documentation, insight and support:
To develop results-based management controls
For enterprise budget reporting and analysis
To communicative initiative value
For improving decision making and performance measurement through "lessons learned"
Change and ad hoc reporting requirements

Uses in Capital Investment Planning
A holistic approach to Capital Investment Planning (CIP), using the portfolio approach, requires a significant amount of supporting documentation.  The VMM approach can provide planning data and performance assessment criteria for the following:

Summary of spending
Project description and justification
Performance goals and measures
Alternatives analysis
Risk inventory and assessment
Program management (partial)
Acquisition strategy (partial)
Project and funding plan (partial)
Business case criteria (partial)

In particular, VMM allows quantitative reporting of commitments to particular intangibles across a number of initiatives, even when they differ by their stage in their lifecycles.

Related theories 
Val IT – Getting value from IT investments (published by ISACA), which helps link VMM to IT governance.
Risk management – as risks play a large part in VMM
Enterprise architecture – as enterprise architects are central players in planning programs of work
Value theory – as this provides a core background to understanding what people value
Social earnings ratio - the non-financial corollary to the financial metric price earnings ratio

See also
 Value networks
 Value network analysis

References

Further reading 
  – the first articulation of VMM
The VMM How-To Guide
Highlights from the VMM How-To Guide
 The Introduction to VMM
VMM FAQ
IT Investment Guidance from the US General Accounting Office
Introduction to VMM for fgdc.gov by Booz Allen Hamilton
GAO-06-250 "Information Technology: Agencies Need to Improve the Accuracy and Reliability of Investment Information" (Jan 2006) from US General Accounting Office
Measuring the expected benefits of e-government – Appendix 5 "Generic Cost Elements for IT Projects" from UK Office of Government Commerce
VMM references from  ANAO (Australian National Audit Office) and AGIMO (Australian Government Information Management Office)
measuring all the assets that drive enterprise performance and value creation

External links 
US Federal Chief Information Officers Council
US Gov eStrategy VMM Workshop

Corporate governance
Booz Allen Hamilton